Trunk 6 is part of the Canadian province of Nova Scotia's system of trunk highways. It is part of the Sunrise Trail, a designated tourist route.

Route description

From Amherst, Trunk 6 goes in an easterly direction to the village of Port Philip, where it meets the Northumberland Strait. The route then follows the strait's shoreline through Pugwash, Wallace and Tatamagouche to the town of Pictou.

Until the construction of Highway 106 in the late 1960s, Trunk 6 continued south to New Glasgow on the Alma Road and Trunk 4.

Communities

Amherst (Victoria Street East and Victoria Street West)
East Amherst
Shinimicas Bridge
Port Howe
Port Philip
Pugwash
Wallace
Tatamagouche
River John
Toney River
Pictou

Major intersections

See also
 List of Nova Scotia provincial highways

References

Amherst, Nova Scotia
006
006
006
006